A Coruña (historical English: Corunna or The Groyne) is a city and municipality of Galicia, Spain. A Coruña is the most populated city in Galicia and the second most populated municipality in the autonomous community and seventeenth overall in the country. The city is the provincial capital of the province of the same name, having also served as political capital of the Kingdom of Galicia from the 16th to the 19th centuries, and as a regional administrative centre between 1833 and 1982, before being replaced by Santiago de Compostela.

A Coruña is located on a promontory in the Golfo Ártabro, a large gulf on the Atlantic Ocean. It is the main industrial and financial centre of northern Galicia, and holds the headquarters of the Universidade da Coruña. A Coruña is a packed city, the Spanish city featuring the tallest mean-height of buildings, also featuring a population density of 21,972 inhabitants per square km of built land area.

Name

Origin
There is no clear evidence as to what the name derives from. It seems to be from Crunia, of unknown origin and meaning. At the time of Ferdinand II of León (reigned 1157–1188) the name Crunia was documented for the first time. As usual in Galician-Portuguese (as well as in Castilian Spanish), the cluster ni naturally evolved into the sound , written n, nn or nh in old Galician orthography, nn in Spanish (later abbreviated to ñ, like the original Latin cluster "nn"), and nh in Portuguese and alternative Galician spelling. "A" is the Galician-Portuguese article equivalent to English the; compare Castilian Spanish la ("the").

One proposed etymology derives Crunia from Cluny, the town in France. During its height (c. 950–c.1130) the Cluniac religious movement became very prominent in Europe. There is another town named Coruña in Burgos Province.

A more likely possibility is that the name simply means "The Crown", which in Galician is A Coroa and in Spanish is La Corona. It seems less likely that it traces back to the Galician clunia. The name is reputedly from the Greek Κορώνα (Crown), referring to the crown of Geryon that was buried by Hercules under the lighthouse he built to his honour. The hero Hercules slew the giant tyrant Geryon after three days and three nights of continuous battle. Hercules then—in a Celtic gesture—buried the head of Geryon with his weapons and ordered that a city be built on the site. The lighthouse atop a skull and crossbones representing the buried head of Hercules' slain enemy appears in the coat-of-arms of the city of A Coruña, Loukeris (2019).

A proxy evolution within the Portuguese language points out to the Latin word Colonya as its origin, where the L was transformed into R which occurs widely in Portuguese. A similar happening can be found today in Coronie, a Surinamese town which also made its course outside the Portuguese system.

A folk etymology incorrectly derives Coruña from the ancient columna, or Tower of Hercules.

Use 
In English, use of the Spanish or Galician forms now predominates. However, the traditional English form Corunna  can persist, particularly in reference to the Battle of Corunna (1809) in the Peninsular War. Archaically, English-speakers knew the city as "The Groyne", probably from French La Corogne. In Spain, the official form of the name is now the Galician one: "A Coruña", though many Spaniards continue to use "La Coruña". Certain groups of people have advocated elevating the reintegrationist spelling "Corunha" to official status, pointing to the provisions of the Spanish Constitution of 1978 and claiming that it is unconstitutional to stipulate use of the Real Academia Galega spelling, but they have not been successful .

Geography 

A Coruña is located on a peninsula, and its isthmus was at times formed only by a small strip of sand. Erosion and sea currents caused a progressive accumulation of sand, enlarging it to its present dimensions.

Climate 
A Coruña has a warm-summer Mediterranean climate (Csb) in the Köppen climate classification, though heavily influenced by the Atlantic Ocean. Autumn is usually mild with spring-like temperatures, but winter is often unsettled and unpredictable, with strong winds and abundant rainfall coming from Atlantic depressions. The ocean keeps temperatures mild all year round (the variation between winter and summer temperatures is only  on average), and therefore frost and snow are extremely rare. In fact, the city has not received significant snowfall since January 1987. A Coruña lies in plant hardiness zone 10b.

Temperatures above  occur many days in the summer, while temperatures above  are infrequent.

Administrative divisions

Parishes 
A Coruña has five parishes, or : A Coruña, San Vicente de Elviña, Santa María de Oza, San Cristóbal das Viñas, and San Pedro de Visma.

Districts 

 Cidade Vella (Old town)
 A Mariña
 Os Cantóns
 Pescaría (Pescadería)
 Ensanche
 Cidade Xardín
 Riazor
 Catro Camiños
 A Gaiteira
 Os Mallos
 Zalaeta-Orzán
 Torre-As Atochas
 Monte Alto
 As Lagoas
 Falperra–Santa Lucía
 Juan Flórez–San Paulo
 Os Castros
 A Agra do Orzán
 O Peruleiro
 A Agrela
 Sagrada Familia-Campo de Vionho
 Labañou–San Roque
 Barrio das Flores
 Elviña
 O Ventorrillo
 O Castrillón
 As Durmideiras
 O Birloque
 O Martinete
 Matogrande
 As Roseiras (Rosales)
 Paseo das Pontes
 Mesoiro
 Novo Mesoiro
 Someso
 Eirís
 Monelos
 San Cristovo das Viñas
 San Pedro de Visma
 San Vicenzo de Elviña
 Bens
 Nostián
 O Portiño
 A Silva–San Xosé
 Palavea
 Santa Xema
 Casabranca–As Xubias
 Feáns
 A Zapateira
 Santa Margarida

History

Prehistory

A Coruña spread from the peninsula, the site of the later Tower of Hercules, onto the mainland. The oldest part, known popularly in Galician as Cidade Vella (Old City), Cidade Alta (High City) or the Cidade (City), is built on an ancient Celtic castro. It was supposedly inhabited by the Brigantes and Artabrians, the Celtic tribes of the area.

Roman times
The Romans came to the region in the 2nd century BC; they made the most of the strategic position and soon the city became quite important in maritime trade. In 62 BC Julius Caesar came to the city (known at the time as Brigantium) in pursuit of the metal trade, establishing commerce with what are now France, England and Portugal. The town began to grow, mainly during the 1st and 2nd centuries (when the Farum Brigantium Tower of Hercules was built), but declined after the 4th century and particularly with the incursions of the Vikings, which forced the population to flee towards the interior of the Estuary of O Burgo.

Middle Ages
After the fall of the Roman Empire, A Coruña still had a commercial port connected to foreign countries, but contacts with the Mediterranean were slowly replaced by a more Atlantic-oriented focus. The process of deurbanisation that followed the fall of the Roman Empire also affected A Coruña. Between the 7th and 8th centuries, the city was no more than a little village of labourers and sailors.

The 11th-century Chronica iriense names Faro do Burgo (ancient name of A Coruña) as one of the dioceses that king Miro granted to the episcopate of Iria Flavia in the year 572:

"Mirus Rex Sedi suae Hiriensi contulit Dioceses, scilicet Morratium, Salinensem, (...) Bregantinos, Farum..."

"[King Miro granted to his Irienses headquarters the dioceses of Morrazo, Salnés (...). Bergantiños, Faro...]"

The Muslim invasion of the Iberian peninsula left no archaeological evidence in the northwest, so it cannot be said whether or not the Muslim invaders ever reached the city. As Muslim rule in early 8th century Galicia consisted little more than a short-lived overlordship of the remote and rugged region backed by a few garrisons, and the city was no more than a village amidst Roman ruins, the invaders showed the same lack of interest in the ruined city as they did generally for the region.

As the city began to recover during the Middle Ages the main problem for the inhabitants was the Norman raids, as well as the ever-present threat of raids (razzias) from Al-Andalus to the south. During the 9th century there were several Viking attacks on the city, called at that time Faro or Faro Bregancio.

In the year 991, King Vermudo II began the construction of defensive military positions on the coast. At Faro, in the ruins of the Tower of Hercules, a fortress was built, which had a permanent military garrison. To pay for it, he gave power over the city to the bishop of Santiago. The bishop of Santiago became the most important political post in Galicia, and remained so until the 15th century.

In 1208, Alfonso IX re-founded the city of Crunia. Some privileges, such as those of disembarking and selling salt without paying taxes, were granted to the city, and it enjoyed a big growth in fishing and mercantile business. The city grew and extended through the isthmus. In 1446 John II of Castile granted to A Coruña the title of "City". The Catholic Monarchs established the Royal Audience of the Kingdom of Galicia in the city, instead of Santiago. A Coruña also became the headquarters of the Captaincy General. Later, in 1522, Charles V conceded to the city of A Coruña the license to establish the House of Spices, being this the port chosen by Jofre Garcia de Loysa to set his expedition to conquer the Moluccans.

In the late Middle Ages, before the expulsion of the Jews in 1492, a thriving Jewish community created a rich artistic heritage in the city. The most lavishly illuminated Hebrew Bible in medieval Spain was created in A Coruña in 1476. Known as the Kennicott Bible, it is currently housed in the Bodleian Library, Oxford.

Modern period
During the Modern period, the city was a port and centre for the manufacturing of textiles. In 1520, king Carlos I of Spain, met in the courts of A Coruña and embarked from its harbour to be elected Emperor of the Holy Roman Empire (as Charles V). He allowed the government of the Kingdom of Galicia to distribute spice in Europe between 1522 and 1529. Commerce with the Indies was allowed between 1529 and 1575. San Antón Castle was built as a defense of the city and its harbour.

From the port of Ferrol in the Province of A Coruña, Philip II left to marry Mary Tudor in 1554, and much later, in 1588, from the same port the Spanish Armada would set sail to the Spanish Netherlands and England.

In the following year, during the Anglo-Spanish War, Francis Drake besieged A Coruña, but was repelled, starting the legend of María Pita, a woman who took her dead husband's spear, killed the flag bearer of the British forces and rallied support to deny a breach in the wall to the enemy.

In the 16th and 17th centuries, the wars of the Spanish monarchy caused a great increase in taxes and the start of conscription. In 1620, Philip III created the School of the Boys of the Sea. In 1682 the Tower of Hercules was restored by Antúnez.

19th century

A Coruña was the site of the Battle of Corunna during the Peninsular War, on 16 January 1809, in which British troops fought against the French to cover the embarkation of British troops after their retreat. In this battle Sir John Moore was killed.

Spanish resistance during the Peninsular War was led by Sinforiano López, and A Coruña was the only Galician city that achieved success against the French troops.  French troops left Galicia at the end of May 1809.

During the 19th century, the city was the centre of anti-monarchist sentiment. On 19 August 1815, Juan Díaz Porlier, pronounced against Fernando VII in defense of the Spanish Constitution of 1812. He was supported by the bourgeoisie and the educated people. But on 22 August he was betrayed. He was hanged in the Campo da Leña two months later. In all the 19th-century rebellions, A Coruña supported the liberal side. A Coruña also played an important role in the Rexurdimento, and there were founded the Galician Royal Academy in 1906 and the Brotherhoods of the Galician Language in 1916.

Regarding the economy, in 1804 the National Cigarette Factory was founded, and there the workers' movement of the city had its origins. During the 19th century other businesses (glass, foundries, textiles, gas, matches, etc.) were slowly established, but it was maritime trade and migrant travel that attracted Catalan, Belgian, French and English investments. The Bank of A Coruña was founded in 1857. The new provincial division of 1832 also influenced economic development.

20th and 21st centuries
At the beginning of the 20th century, A Coruña had about 45,000 inhabitants. The Great Depression and the Spanish Civil War severely affected the economy through the 1930s to the mid-1950s. The 1960s and early 1970s saw a dramatic economic recovery, which was part of the wider Spanish Miracle. As elsewhere in Galicia, A Coruña attracted a massive influx of Galician-speaking rural dwellers, into their quickly developed neighbourhoods. The period between 1960 and 1980 saw a big transformation in most areas of the city from being agricultural dwellings to urban districts. The international oil shocks of the mid and late 1970s severely disrupted the economy, causing many bankruptcies and high unemployment until the mid-1980s, when slower but steady economic development was resumed.

Elections of 1931
In the Spanish general elections, 1931, all the political parties knew that the electoral results had important political consequences. The campaign of Unión Monárquica was very important in A Coruña and was supported by El Ideal Gallego. Republicans and socialists constituted a block, made up of ORGA, independent republicans, Spanish Socialist Workers' Party (PSOE) and the Radical Socialist Republican Party.

In the elections, the republican parties obtained 34 of the 39 council seats. The best results were of the ORGA and of the Partido Radical Socialista, and the Radical Republican Party lost a lot of support.

Democracy returns

From 1983 to 2006, the mayor of the city was Francisco Vázquez Vázquez (PSOE), and the city became devoted to services, but he also was criticised because of his being openly against Galician nationalism, favouring the already established Castillian-Spanish social dominance and extending the equally deep-rooted prejudice against Galician language and cultural expression. Another downside's of Mr Vazquez legacy would be his town-planning policies, with big-money pharaoh-like projects with little social impact (shopping centres, Millennium obelisk, etc.). However, on a positive note Mr Vazquez's 23 year-long mandate saw the European-funded Maritime Promenade and the city's Scientific Museums (Casa das Ciencias-Planetario-, Casa dos Peixes-Aquarium and Casa do Home-Domus).

On 20 January 2006 Vázquez was named ambassador to the Vatican City, and was later replaced by Francisco Javier Losada de Azpiazu. In 2007 Municipal Elections the local government was a coalition of the Socialists' Party of Galicia and the left-wing nationalist Galician Nationalist Bloc party. The city celebrated its first millennium in 2008.

In the 2011 Municipal Elections, the conservative candidate Carlos Negreira (PP) obtained a majority, the first one for the People's Party in the city since the arrival of democracy.

The mayor of the 2015–2019 mandate was Xulio Ferreiro, from the Marea Atlántica ("Atlantic Tide") party, who was elected in 2015 on an anti-corruption mandate. His remit was to improve the town planning of the city rather than to leave it to the mercy of corrupt, unregulated free-market policies which have left a negative legacy in many areas of the municipality. He has widespread support across the region in opposition to a project to sell off the city's port (a legacy of the preceding mayor Carlos Negreira) to a private equity firm, which wants to construct a gated community of high-rise apartment blocks for which there is no real market demand in a city with a population of fewer than 250,000 inhabitants. The plan is to put a covenant on the land and to encourage a civic consultation on redevelopment of the site.

The current mayor is Inés Rey of PSdeG-PSOE.

Population

The province and city of A Coruña during the 20th century
After the War of Independence (1808–1814), the fortunes of Ferrol began to deteriorate. The largest port in northern Spain, site of the Reales Astilleros de Esteiro, one of the three Royal Royal Dockyards together with Cartagena and Cádiz, almost became a "dead" town during the reign of Ferdinand VII. By 1833 the City and Naval Station of Ferrol saw its civilian population reduced to 13,000. During the administration of the marquess of Molina, Minister for Naval affairs in the mid-19th century new activities sprang up, but Ferrol never fully returned to its former glory. During those years, most of the Spanish colonies in Latin America succeeded in gaining independence from their former metropolis.

The population of the City of A Coruña in 1900 reached 43,971, while the population of the rest of the province including the City and Naval Station of nearby Ferrol as well as Santiago de Compostela was 653,556. A Coruña's miraculous growth happened during the aftermath of the Spanish Civil War at a similar rate to other major Galician cities, but it was after the death of Francisco Franco when the city of A Coruña (and Vigo) left all the other Galician cities behind.

The meteoric increase in the population of the City of A Coruña during the years which followed the Spanish Civil War in the mid 20th century was accompanied by the decline in the villages and hamlets of the province as it industrialized.

found: INE Archiv – graphic for Wikipedia

The city today

The municipality of A Coruña has 247.604 inhabitants and a population density of around 6,700 inhabitants per square kilometer.

In 2010 there were 12,344 foreigners living in the city, representing 5% of the total population. The main nationalities are Brazilians (10%), Colombians (8%) and Peruvians (7%).

By language, according to 2008 data, 7.75% of the population speak Galician as a primary language, 36% speak Spanish and the rest use both interchangeably.

A Coruña metropolitan area has 431.332 inhabitants.

Main sights

The city is the site of the Roman Tower of Hercules, a lighthouse which has been in continuous operation since possibly the 2nd century AD. It has been declared by UNESCO as a World Heritage Site. It is surrounded by a large public park with a golf course and the so-called Moor's Graveyard (Cemiterio do Moro in Galician, Cementerio del Moro in Spanish) a building where in fact there were never burials, Muslim or not, which now houses the Casa das Palabras (Galician for House of Words) museum. The lighthouse features as the main emblem of the city's flag and coat of arms.

The city is also well known for its characteristic glazed window balconies, called galerías. Originally, this type of structure came about as a naval architecture solution for the challenging weather, particularly designed for rainy days. This fashion started in nearby Ferrol in the 18th century when some of the technicians working for the Royal Dockyards had the idea of using the shape of the back of a warship in a modern building. Soon afterward, most seaports in northern Spain, were adding these glazed window balconies to their city-port houses.

The Old Town (Ciudad Vieja in Spanish, Cidade Vella in Galician) is the name given to the oldest part of A Coruña. During the ninth and tenth centuries, the inhabitants of what was then called Faro Island (peninsula where the Tower of Hercules stands) were leaving the area due to constant attacks by the Viking fleet and settled in the area of Betanzos. In 1208 King Alfonso IX refounded the city at the present site of the Old Town and put it under his personal control, free from allegiance to the clergy or feudal lords. In the fourteenth century, the scarcely-surviving city walls of the Old Town were built, as well as three harbors: the Parrot and San Miguel. It also preserves the stronghold known as the Old Fortress, now converted into the Garden of San Carlos, in which Sir John Moore is buried. The Old City of A Coruña kept streets and squares that revive the city's history and noble mansions and residences such as Rosalia de Castro's house, located on Prince Street. Notable buildings are the Royal Galician Academy, the institution dedicated to the study of Galician culture and especially the Galician language, the Romanesque churches of Santiago and Saint Mary, As Bárbaras Monastery (Romanesque  and Baroque) and the headquarters of the Operational Logistics Force of the Spanish Army. In July, a Medieval Fair takes place in the streets of the Old City.

The city has several museums, such as the Castle of San Antón Archaeological Museum, Fine Arts Museum and the network of scientific museums (Casa das Ciencias, which also includes a planetarium, DOMUS, made by Arata Isozaki and Aquarium Finisterrae). In 2012, the National Museum of Science and Technology (MUNCYT) opened a branch in the city. A Coruña's social scene is most popular on Summer nights. Most bars and clubs are on Rua do Orzán, which runs directly parallel to Paseo Maritimo on the beach side. Another popular destination, for mostly a more youthful crowd, is Os Xardins (The Gardens), a park near the beginning of Rúa Real and the Os Cantons Village Shopping Centre.

Squares, parks and beaches

 María Pita Square, the most important square in the city. Notable landmarks are the City Hall and the statue of the local heroine Maria Pita. Nearby you can also find Church of Saint George, where first same-sex marriage in Spain took place between Elisa and Marcela in 1901, which is the basis for the movie of the same name.
 Mount of San Pedro Park, a former military area, with views over the city and the ria. Visitors can arrive by road or using an elevator from the promenade. It has a café, play areas, gardens and three restored artillery pieces.
It runs around the city's headland, passing sights such as its Aquarium, the Estadio Riazor and the Tower of Hercules. There used to be a functioning touristic tramway, opened between 1997 and 2002, which ceased operations after a derailment in 2011.
 In the summertime, the Orzán and Riazor beaches are immensely popular destinations, located directly opposite of the port in the central part of the city. During María Pita festivity, which takes place all through August, Riazor is the venue of Noroeste Pop Rock Festival, a free music festival with groups from Spain and abroad (Amaral, David Bisbal, Joe Cocker or Status Quo have played on it in last editions). Other beaches in the city smaller than Orzan and Riazor are As Lapas down Hercules Tower, O Matadoiro next to Orzan, San Amaro and Oza.

Economy

A Coruña is nowadays the richest region of Galicia and its economic engine. There have been various changes in the city's structure over the last few decades—it now shares some administrative functions with the nearby city of Ferrol. Companies have grown, especially in sectors such as finance, communication, planning, sales, manufacturing and technical services, making A Coruña the wealthiest metropolitan area of Galicia. The port itself unloads large amounts of fresh fish, and with the increase in other port activities like crude oil and solid bulk, which make up 75% of Galician port traffic.

In 1975, the clothing company Zara, founded by Amancio Ortega Gaona, opened its first store worldwide in this city and has since become a national and international clothing chain.

Inditex, the main textile manufacturer of the world, has its headquarters in the nearby town of Arteixo. A Coruña concentrates 30% of the GDP of Galicia and in the period between 1999 and 2001 it grew 35%, surpassing Vigo which was traditionally economically stronger. Other important companies of the city are Banco Pastor (owned by Banco Popular Español), Banco Etcheverría (oldest in Spain), Hijos de Rivera Brewery, Abanca, R Cable Operator, the Repsol refinery, Gas Natural combined cycle power plant, General Dynamics factory, Alcoa aluminium plant and La Voz de Galicia, a Spanish-language conservative daily newspaper, the one with the largest circulation in Galicia. A Coruña is also an important retail center. El Corte Inglés, the main department store chain in Spain, has two centers in the city, one of them in the new commercial area Marineda City, opened in April 2011, one of the biggest shopping centers in the EU, which also includes, among others, IKEA and Decathlon stores, cinemas, an ice rink, a bowling court and a kart circuit. Other hypermarket chains present in the city are Carrefour (two centers), Hipercor and Auchan (known in Spain as Alcampo).

Over the last few years, emphasis has been placed upon better access and infrastructure, especially cultural, sporting, leisure and scientific areas. Following a significant oil spill when the Aegean Sea wrecked and exploded, considerable resources have been used in the recovery of the shoreline and strengthening the tourist sector. All this has reaffirmed the city's existing character as a centre for administration, sales, port activities, culture and tourism. The city also has a regional airport, used by 1.025.688 passengers in 2015.

Tourism
Tourism in A Coruña has increased in recent years to the point of receiving 62 cruise ships a year.

The two main beaches of A Coruña (Orzán and Riazor) are located in the heart of the city and are bordered by the promenade above. This location makes them a great attraction for tourists, being also a meeting point for surfers much of the year. Moreover, the city has other beaches like As Lapas, San Amaro, Oza and Matadoiro. These four beaches, along with Riazor and Orzán, were recognized with blue flag certification in 2011.

An important holiday is on the night of San Xoán-Seaone (St John), celebrated with a massive fireworks celebration, parade, bonfires and the ancient fires on all city beaches well into dawn.

In 2006 and for the first time ever, the number of tourists has doubled the population of the city, virtually to 500,000 the number of people who chose the city as a tourist destination.

The city has an extensive network of hotels, with an offer of over 3,000 hotel vacancies. There are one five star-hotel and 11 four star-hotels, as well as many other hotels and hostels. The city is also focusing in business tourism, offering the Congress and Exhibition Centre PALEXCO, with room for more than 2,500 people; a new trade fair centre, EXPOCORUÑA, venue of concerts, exhibitions and festivals like Sónar.

The city is also located on the English Way a path of the Camino de Santiago.

Education and culture

There are 38 pre-school centres, 47 primary schools, 29 vocational schools and 33 secondary schools.

Higher education is represented by the University of A Coruña, a public university established in 1989, the UNED branch, and CESUGA, a private university centre in alliance with University College Dublin, which offers Bachelor of Commerce and Bachelor of Architecture Irish degrees. Escuela de Negocios NCG offers MBA and other master's degrees in business.

There are seven municipal libraries, one library that belongs to the provincial government and one public library, administered by the Xunta. The Archive of the Kingdom of Galicia (Arquivo do Reino de Galicia in Galician) is located in the Old Town.

There is an Escola Oficial de Idiomas (Spanish language school) centre, which offers classes in English, French, Galician, Italian, German, Portuguese, Arabic, Russian, Chinese, Japanese and Spanish as a foreign language.

Music studies are well represented by a Music school. A Coruña is also the base for the Orquesta Sinfónica de Galicia.

The city is home to two main theatres, Teatro Colón and Teatro Rosalía, with regular performances, music concerts and other representations. A multipurpose centre, the Coliseum, hosts a variety of concerts and cultural and sporting events. International artists like David Copperfield, Maná, Mark Knopfler, Shakira, Gloria Estefan, Iron Maiden, Deep Purple and Judas Priest among others have performed there. In summer it also serves as a bullring, and in winter as an ice rink.

A Coruña has several museums, such as the Castle of San Antón Archaeological Museum, its Fine Arts Museum, the Military Museum and the network of scientific museums (Casa das Ciencias, which includes a planetarium, DOMUS, made by Arata Isozaki and Aquarium Finisterrae). In 2012, the [National Museum of Science and Technology (MUNCYT) opened a branch in the city.

The city's principal festival is the María Pita Festival, which lasts from the end of July to mid September. The festival includes Noroeste Pop Rock (free concerts at Riazor beach), free concerts in venues all over the city, the Medieval fair in the Old Town, the International Folklore Festival, a book fair, Festival Viñetas desde o Atlántico, a comic fair and, for the first time in 2011, a recreation of the famous German Oktoberfest. Another very popular festival is Saint John's day, which is celebrated on 23 June with bonfires under the night sky on beaches and neighbourhoods all over the city. More than 150,000 people go out from afternoon to early morning in order to frighten the evil spirits away by jumping over the bonfires. Apart from that, Virxe do Rosario's day is also celebrated, but to such an extent as the festivities previously mentioned.

Transport

A Coruña is the destination of one of the radial roads originating in Madrid, (N-VI). Currently there is a highway (Autovía A-6) that runs parallel to the old radial road. Another major road running through the city is the toll motorway AP-9, which links Ferrol with the Portuguese border crossing the main cities of Galicia. AG-55 motorway links the city with the Costa da Morte, although currently only going as far as Carballo. The conventional road N-550 (A Coruña-Tui) is the main link to the airport while the new highway is still under construction.

It serves mainly Spanish destinations, although there are regular services to London and Lisbon and, in the summer season, to Amsterdam and Paris. In 2010, 1,101,208 passengers used the airport.

Railway services depart from San Cristovo Station. The city will be connected with Madrid and Vigo by high-speed rail in coming years. Regional lines connect the city with Vigo through Santiago de Compostela and Pontevedra, Lugo and Monforte de Lemos. Intercity trains depart to Madrid, Barcelona and the Basque Country, passing through many other important northern Spanish cities. There is a freight train station that serves the port.

Regional and intercity buses depart from the Bus station at Caballeros Street. A Coruña is well connected with its metropolitan area and other Galician cities and towns. Intercity services connect the city with Madrid, Barcelona, Andalusia and the Basque Country among others and with European cities like Geneva, Paris or Munich.

Local transportation in A Coruña is provided by Compañía de Tranvías de A Coruña. Its network includes 24 lines served by 93 vehicles. There is also a regular taxi service from taxi tanks all over the city.

Sport

A Coruña has an extensive network of sports infrastructures. The most important one is the Riazor Sport Complex, which includes Estadio Riazor (home of Deportivo de La Coruña), the Palace of Sports (home of HC Liceo A Coruña), two indoor tracks, a pelota court and an indoor swimming-pool. La Torre Sport Complex hosts many football fields, a golf court and another pelota court. There are also five municipal football fields, 11 sports centres and several marinas (Real Club Náutico, Marina Coruña, etc.). In 2007 the Termaria Casa da Auga complex was opened, which has a gymnasium, a thalassotherapy centre and an indoor Olympic-sized swimming pool.

Deportivo was founded in 1906 and is currently playing in the Primera División RFEF, the third tier of the Spanish league system. Since the Spanish football league system was established in 1928, it has spent 46 seasons in the top division and 41 seasons in the second division. They won the league title once, in the 1999–2000 season, and finished as runners-up on five occasions. The club has also won the Spanish Cup twice (1995 and 2002), and three Spanish Super Cups. Between 2000–01 and 2004–05, Deportivo played in the UEFA Champions League for five seasons in a row, and reached the semi-finals in 2004. The women's section of the team plays in Spain's top division.

The city has a roller hockey team, HC Liceo A Coruña, one of the most successful in Spain, and the team plays in the main League OK Liga. They became Europe's Champions in 2011.

A Coruña basketball team CB Coruña, plays in LEB Oro league, the Spanish second division.

The city's handball team  currently plays in the Spanish First Division.

The American football team Towers Football currently plays in LGFA, the Galician regional gridiron football league.

Two Gaelic football teams were founded in 2010 and 2011, A Coruña Fillos de Breogán (with men and women's teams) and Ártabros de Oleiros (also originating in A Coruña). They participate in the Iberian Championship and in the Galician League.

Casas Novas riding club, in the outskirts of the city, hosts many national and international championships.

In tenpin bowling, A Coruña is home to the annual Teresa Herrera de Bowling tournament, this year (2016) played from 24 to 28 August in the Pleno Bowling Centre, Marineda City. It attracts players from all over Spain.

Politics
Domingos Rafael Merino Mexuto was the first mayor after the Spanish Constitution of 1978 for the PSG party (he is now in the BNG party), and he currently works at the Galician Ombudsman's (Valedor) office.

Francisco Vázquez Vázquez from the PSOE became mayor of the city in 1983; however, on becoming the Spanish ambassador to the Vatican, he was replaced by Javier Losada on 10 February 2006.

The mayor between 2015 and 2019 was Xulio Ferreiro, from the Marea Atlántica ("Atlantic Tide") party, who was elected in 2015 on an anti-corruption mandate. One of his main priorities was to reverse some of the very worst examples of town planning policy which has left a negative legacy in many areas of the city and its immediate suburbs.

The current mayor is Inés Rey of PSdeG-PSOE.

Notable people
 Maria Pita, María Mayor Fernández de Cámara y Pita (1565–1643), a Galician-Spanish heroine of the defence of A Coruña in 1589 against the English Armada
 Ramón Dionisio José de la Sagra y Peris (1798–1871), botany teacher, philosopher and social economist
 Evaristo Martelo Paumán (1850-1928), poet and Rexurdimento activist
 Emilia Pardo Bazán (1851–1921), novelist, journalist, essayist and critic
 Eduardo Dato Iradier (1856–1921), lawyer and politician
 Ramón Menéndez Pidal (1869–1968), writer
 Eugenia Osterberger (1852–1932), pianist and composer
 Pablo Picasso, (1881–1973), artist, lived here for four years in the 1890s
 Santiago Casares Quiroga (1884–1950), lawyer and politician
 Wenceslao Fernández Flórez (1885–1964), narrator and journalist
 Salvador de Madariaga y Rojo (1896–1978), writer and poet
 Enrique Líster (1907-1994), communist politician and military general 
 Fernando Casado Arambillet (1917–1994), better known as Fernando Rey, actor
 Amando de Ossorio (1918–2001), film director
 Carmela Arias y Díaz de Rábago (1920–2009), first woman president of a bank in Spain
 María Casares (1922–1996), actress
 Manolo Sanchez (born 1929), long-time valet to U.S. president Richard Nixon.
 Luis Suárez Miramontes (born 1935), football player and manager
 Amancio Ortega, (born 1936 in Castilla y León), founder of fashion brand Zara (clothing)
 Amancio Amaro Varela (born 1939), football player
 Emilio Pérez Touriño (born 1948), former president of the Spanish autonomous community of Galicia
 Manuel Rivas Barros (born 1957), writer, poet, essayist and journalist
 Fernando Romay, (born 1959), basketball player
 María Pujalte, (born 1966), actress
 Marta Sánchez, (born 1966), singer
 Nadia Calviño (born 1968), incumbent Minister of Economy and former director-general for Budget of the European Union
 Andrés Manuel Díaz, (born 1969), athlete
 Mario Casas, (born 1986), actor
 Lucas Pérez, (born 1988), football player for Deportivo Alavés

International relations

Twin towns – sister cities
A Coruña is twinned with:

 Cádiz, Spain
 Limerick, Ireland
 Brest, France
 Turku, Finland
 Lavras, Brazil

See also

Celtic nations
Celts
Ethnic groups in Europe
Galician music
Galician nationalism
Galician people
Galician wine
Modern Celts
Timeline of Galician history
Way of St. James (Camino de Santiago)

Notes

References

External links

 Concello da Coruña
  Tourism Office website for A Coruña (Turismo Coruña – Town Council)
  Tourism website for A Coruña (TurGalicia – Regional Tourism Office)
 Tourism website – Travel Guide for A Coruña (TurEspaña – National Tourism Office)
 Pinocho in A Coruña: An illustrated guidebook to A Coruña

 
Populated coastal places in Spain
Port cities and towns on the Spanish Atlantic coast